The Hejaz Railway Museum (Arabic: متحف سكة الحجاز) in Medina is a railway museum that was opened in 2006. It is on the grounds of the restored historic Ottoman railway station at Medina, locally called استسيون "Istasyōn", including a stretch of the historic track and a train shed with originally four tracks.  There are several engines and pieces of rolling stock on display, some of which were transported to the museum from other places along the historic Hejaz railway line.  At least one engine has been restored enough to be driveable on the museum tracks.  It is, along with the old train station at Mada'in Saleh, one of two museums in Saudi Arabia dedicated to the Hejaz railway.

See also 

 List of museums in Saudi Arabia

References

External links 
 A list of the eleven locomotives of the Hejaz railway that have survived including six at Medina is cited here, discussing the origin of some. Most of the information is taken from the German book "Die Hedschas-Bahn – Eine Deutsche Eisenbahn in der Wüste", by Dieter Noll/Benno Bickel/Ahmad v. Denffer, DGEG, 1995.
 Picture gallery with pictures among others of the fully restored functional engine 105 according to the plate on this picture.

2006 establishments in Saudi Arabia
Railway museums in Saudi Arabia
Museums established in 2006
Buildings and structures in Medina
History museums in Saudi Arabia
Hejaz railway
Tourist attractions in Medina